Cecil Reginald Napp Maxwell (21 May 1913 – 25 September 1973) was an English first-class cricketer.

After attending Brighton College, Cecil Maxwell was recruited by Sir Julien Cahn to play in his professional cricket team. Maxwell represented the Gentlemen versus the Players at Lord's in 1935. He played in 44 first-class matches for Nottinghamshire, MCC, Middlesex and Worcestershire as a right-handed batsman and a wicket-keeper between 1932 and 1951. His highest first-class innings (and only hundred) – 268 for Sir Julien Cahn's XI against Leicestershire in 1935, made in 190 minutes – is the highest by any player batting at number eight.

References

External links
 
 Cecil Maxwell at CricketArchive

1913 births
1973 deaths
People from Paddington
People educated at Brighton College
English cricketers
Marylebone Cricket Club cricketers
Middlesex cricketers
Nottinghamshire cricketers
Worcestershire cricketers
North v South cricketers
Gentlemen cricketers
Sir Julien Cahn's XI cricketers
English cricketers of 1919 to 1945
H. D. G. Leveson Gower's XI cricketers